Superpower disengagement is a foreign policy option whereby the most powerful nations, the superpowers, reduce their interventions in an area.  Such disengagement could be multilateral among superpowers or lesser powers, or bilateral between two superpowers, or unilateral.  It could mean an end to either direct or indirect interventions.  For instance, disengagement could mean that the superpowers remove their support of proxies in proxy wars in order to de-escalate a superpower conflict back to a local problem based on local disputes.  Disengagement can create buffers between superpowers that might prevent conflicts or reduce the intensity of conflicts.

The term usually refers to various policy proposals during the Cold War which attempted to defuse tensions between the Soviet Union and the United States, largely because of the risk of any superpower conflict to escalate to nuclear war.  Examples of one-sided disengagement include when Joseph Stalin decided to end Soviet support for the communist guerrillas in Greece during the Greek Civil War, and when Richard Nixon withdrew US troops from Vietnam in the early 1970s.  

The more important candidates for disengagement were where Soviet and US forces faced each other directly such as in Germany and Austria.  The Austrian State Treaty is an example of formal, multilateral, superpower disengagement which left Austria as neutral for the duration of the Cold War, with Austria staying out of the Warsaw Pact, NATO, and the European Economic Community.  The 1952 Stalin Note is perhaps the most controversial proposal of superpower disengagement from Germany.

See also
 Neutral and Non-Aligned European States

International relations terminology
Disengagement